Aiello del Sabato is a town and comune in the province of Avellino, Campania, southern Italy. Its name derives from the Latin agellus (meaning "field") and from the Sabato river, a tributary of the Calore Irpino.

Archaeological excavations have proven a human presence in  the area from as early as the Roman era, and perhaps from the Palaeolithic Age. Aiello was however documented for the first time in 1045 AD.

Cities and towns in Campania